Computational semantics is the study of how to automate the process of constructing and reasoning with meaning representations of natural language expressions. It consequently plays an important role in natural-language processing and computational linguistics.

Some traditional topics of interest are: construction of meaning representations, semantic underspecification, anaphora resolution, presupposition projection, and quantifier scope resolution. Methods employed usually draw from formal semantics or statistical semantics. Computational semantics has points of contact with the areas of lexical semantics (word-sense disambiguation and semantic role labeling), discourse semantics, knowledge representation and automated reasoning (in particular, automated theorem proving). Since 1999 there has been an ACL special interest group on computational semantics, SIGSEM.

See also
 Discourse representation theory
 Formal semantics (natural language)
 Minimal recursion semantics
 Natural-language understanding
 Semantic compression
 Semantic parsing
 Semantic Web
 SemEval
 WordNet

Further reading
 Blackburn, P., and Bos, J. (2005), Representation and Inference for Natural Language: A First Course in Computational Semantics, CSLI Publications. .
 Bunt, H., and Muskens, R. (1999), Computing Meaning, Volume 1, Kluwer Publishing, Dordrecht. .
 Bunt, H., Muskens, R., and Thijsse, E. (2001), Computing Meaning, Volume 2, Kluwer Publishing, Dordrecht. .
 Copestake, A., Flickinger, D. P., Sag, I. A., & Pollard, C. (2005). Minimal Recursion Semantics. An introduction. In Research on Language and Computation. 3:281–332.
 Eijck, J. van, and C. Unger (2010): Computational Semantics with Functional Programming. Cambridge University Press. 
 Wilks, Y., and Charniak, E. (1976), Computational Semantics: An Introduction to Artificial Intelligence and Natural Language Understanding, North-Holland, Amsterdam. .

References

External links 
 Special Interest Group on Computational Semantics (SIGSEM) of the Association for Computational Linguistics (ACL)
 IWCS - International Workshop on Computational Semantics (endorsed by SIGSEM)
 ICoS - Inference in Computational Semantics (endorsed by SIGSEM)

Computational linguistics
Natural language processing
Semantics
Computational fields of study